Kitchen ventilation is the branch of ventilation specialising in the treatment of air from kitchens. It addresses the problems of grease, smoke and odours not found in most other ventilation systems.

Kitchen ventilation equipment includes an extractor hood or canopy, and a filtering system. The system's fan may be located in the kitchen or in its ducts.

Requirements 
An adequate kitchen ventilation system should:

 Remove cooking fumes at the source, i.e. as close as possible to the cooking equipment.
 Remove excess hot air and introduce cool clean air, maintaining a comfortable environment. Inadequate ventilation can cause stress, contributing to unsafe working conditions and high staff turnover.
 Ensure that air movement in the kitchen does not cause discomfort.
 Provide sufficient air for complete combustion at fired appliances, and prevent the risk of carbon monoxide accumulation.
 Be easy to clean (intermittent e.g., manually, or continuously e.g. using ozone) so that fat residues do not accumulate in the hood and ducts and block air inlets, leading to loss of efficiency and increasing fire risk.
 Be quiet and vibration-free.

Kitchen ventilation design
The design of an effective kitchen ventilation system is determined by:

 The kitchen's workload
 The amount, type and power of cooking equipment
 The kitchen's layout and shape
 The number of kitchen staff
 The need for easy cleaning and maintenance
 Energy efficiency

Hot air from cooking is usually vented externally through a chimney system. When this is not possible, recirculating cooker hoods are used that clean the air and direct it back into the kitchen.

Grease filters
The most common types of grease filters used in professional kitchens are:

 Water-based
 Cyclonic
 Ultraviolet (UV)
 TurboSwing

Comfort

A comfortable kitchen is generally considered to have:
 A temperature of 20 °C in winter and 28 °C in summer, with a maximum difference of 6 °C from the outside temperature
 Relative humidity of approximately 70%
 Air velocity less than 0.5 m/s (0.3 m/s in refrigerated areas)

References

Ventilation
Heating, ventilation, and air conditioning
Kitchen